79th NYFCC Awards
January 6, 2014

Best Picture: 
American Hustle

The 79th New York Film Critics Circle Awards, honoring the best in film for 2013, were announced on December 3, 2013 and presented on January 6, 2014.

Winners

Best Film:
American Hustle
Runners-up: 12 Years a Slave (2), and Gravity and Her (3)
Best Director:
Steve McQueen – 12 Years a Slave
Runners-up: David O. Russell – American Hustle (2) and Spike Jonze – Her (3)
Best Actor:
Robert Redford – All Is Lost
Runners-up: Chiwetel Ejiofor – 12 Years a Slave (2) and Oscar Isaac – Inside Llewyn Davis (2)
Best Actress:
Cate Blanchett – Blue Jasmine
Runners-up: Amy Adams – American Hustle (2) and Adèle Exarchopoulos – Blue Is the Warmest Colour (3)
Best Supporting Actor:
Jared Leto – Dallas Buyers Club
Runners-up: Michael Fassbender – 12 Years a Slave (2) and James Franco – Spring Breakers (2)
Best Supporting Actress:
Jennifer Lawrence – American Hustle
Runners-up: Lupita Nyong'o – 12 Years a Slave (2) and June Squibb – Nebraska (3)
Best Screenplay:
 Eric Warren Singer and David O. Russell – American Hustle
Runners-up: Richard Linklater, Julie Delpy, and Ethan Hawke – Before Midnight (2) and Spike Jonze – Her (3)
Best Animated Film:
The Wind Rises
Runners-up: Frozen (2) and Monsters University (3)
Best Cinematography:
Bruno Delbonnel – Inside Llewyn Davis
Runners-up: Emmanuel Lubezki – Gravity (2) and Phedon Papamichael – Nebraska (3)
Best Non-Fiction Film:
Stories We Tell
Runners-up: The Act of Killing (2) and 20 Feet from Stardom (3)
Best Foreign Language Film:
Blue Is the Warmest Colour • France
Runners-up: The Past (2) and The Great Beauty (3)
Best First Film:
Ryan Coogler – Fruitvale Station

References

External links
 2013 Awards
 How NYFCC Balloting Went Down

New York Film Critics Circle Awards
New York
2013 in American cinema
2013 awards in the United States
2013 in New York City